Sir Edward Taihakurei Durie  (born 18 January 1940) was the first Māori appointed as a judge of a New Zealand court. He is of Rangitāne, Ngāti Kauwhata and Ngāti Raukawa descent; Mason Durie (1889–1971) was his grandfather.

Early life and education
Durie graduated with a BA and an LLB from Victoria University of Wellington in 1964. He holds honorary doctorates from Victoria University of Wellington, Massey University and the University of Waikato.

Career
Durie was appointed a Judge in 1974 and then was the Chief Judge of the Māori Land Court from 1980–1998, Chairman of the Waitangi Tribunal from 1980–2004, and a Law Commissioner. In 1998 he was appointed to the High Court. He retired from the High Court in 2004, at which point he was the longest-serving member of the New Zealand judiciary.

In 2009, Durie was appointed by Attorney-General Chris Finlayson to chair the Ministerial taskforce on the Foreshore and Seabed Act 2004.

In 2012, Durie was elected to the Maori Council and elected co-chair, a role he held until being appointed the sole chair of the national body in April 2016.

Honours and awards
In 1977, Durie was awarded the Queen Elizabeth II Silver Jubilee Medal, and in 1990 he received the New Zealand 1990 Commemoration Medal. In the 2008 New Year Honours, Durie was appointed a Distinguished Companion of the New Zealand Order of Merit, for services to the Maori Land Court, Waitangi Tribunal and High Court of New Zealand. In 2009, following the reinstatement of titular honours by the New Zealand government, he accepted redesignation as a Knight Companion of New Zealand Order of Merit.

Personal life
Durie is married to lawyer Donna Hall who operates a law firm, Woodward, from their home in Lower Hutt New Zealand. He is the younger brother of renowned Māori academic, Professor Sir Mason Durie.

On 13 April 2002, Durie's 8-month-old adopted daughter Kahurautete ('Kahu') was kidnapped at gunpoint in Lower Hutt and held for $3 million ransom. The kidnapper was sentenced to eleven years imprisonment and released after serving seven years. The kidnapping was the subject of the 2010 film Stolen: The Baby Kahu Story in which Eddie Durie was played by George Henare.

References

External links
 'Our Team' – New Zealand Māori Council

High Court of New Zealand judges
Academic staff of the Massey University
Knights Companion of the New Zealand Order of Merit
Living people
1940 births
New Zealand Māori academics
Place of birth missing (living people)
Victoria University of Wellington alumni
Rangitāne people
Ngāti Raukawa people
New Zealand Māori judges
People from Feilding
Members of the Waitangi Tribunal
Eddie